Buffonellodidae is a family of bryozoans belonging to the order Cheilostomatida.

Genera:
 Aimulosia Jullien, 1888
 Buffonellodes Strand, 1928
 Chataimulosia Gordon & Taylor, 1999
 Hippadenella Canu & Bassler, 1917
 Ipsibuffonella Gordon & d'Hondt, 1997
 Julianca Gordon, 1989
 Kymella Canu & Bassler, 1917
 Maiabuffonella Gordon & d'Hondt, 1997
 Xenogma Gordon, 2014

References

Bryozoan families